Tiberianus was a late Latin writer and poet, surviving only in fragments, who experimented with various metrical schemes.

He is a possible candidate for the authorship of the Pervigilium Veneris.

Identity
Tiberianus has traditionally been identified with Annius Tiberianus, the "eloquent" [disertus] governor of Gaul in 336 AD mentioned by Jerome.

An earlier candidate is however the prefect of Rome 303–4, Iunius Tiberianus.

Known poems
Four poems (and a fragmentary fifth on a sunset) are known to have been written by Tiberianus: 
Spring Day [Amnis ibat]; an attack on the power of gold; a hymn; and a description of a dying bird.

Other writings
Fabius Planciades Fulgentius attributed to Tiberianus the writing of prosimetra, dialogues in verse and prose, (from which the extant poems may have been taken).
E. Baehrens in the 19thC suggested Tiberianus as the author of the Pervigilium Veneris, something metrical parallels with Amnis ibat would seem to support. Alan Cameron in the 20thC strengthened the case for his authorship through thematic and vocabulary parallels.

Influences
Tiberianus was influenced by Silver Age poets such as Ovid and Statius, and also by Titus Calpurnius Siculus, as well as by the prose of Apuleius.

Read and quoted by Fulgentius and Augustine, his metrical experiments may also have influenced such Christian poets as Hilary of Poitiers and Prudentius.

See also
Ausonius
Paulinus of Nola

References

Further reading
E Courtney, The Fragmentary Roman Poets (1993)

External links 
 "Catullus. Tibullus. Pervigilium Veneris"

4th-century Roman poets
4th-century Latin writers